Caelum Moor is a sculpture by Norman Hines in Arlington, Texas. It was completed in 1986 and consists of five large stone arrangements placed around a  park.

References

External links

Works by Norman Hines
1986 sculptures
Granite sculptures in Texas
Abstract sculptures in Texas